Muscovite Lakes Provincial Park is a provincial park in British Columbia, Canada.

References
BC Parks webpage

External links

Peace River Regional District
Provincial parks of British Columbia
Northern Interior of British Columbia
Protected areas established in 2001
2001 establishments in British Columbia